Yehoshua Sofer is also the name of a victim of the June 2010 West Bank shooting.

Yehoshua Sofer is an Israeli-Jamaican hip hop and rap artist, and a martial artist.

Biography
He was born in 1958 in Jamaica and his family moved to Los Angeles in 1963 where he studied Tang Soo Do, receiving a black belt by 1968, aged ten. He studied Kuk Sool Won from 1974, advancing to 6th dan, and worked as a trainer and bodyguard during the 1970s and 1980s.

Singing career

In the 1990s, he was a hip hop singer and rapper under the name Nigel Addmore, and was an MC on the album Humus Metamtem in 1993. The album's track "Hummus makes you stupid" was a club hit in Israel.  

He appeared in the documentary films Awake Zion in 2005, and Hummus the Movie in 2016

Martial arts career

In 2000, he ran a Kuk Sool Won school at the International Convention, Jerusalem.

In 2002, he founded the Abir Warrior Arts Association of Israel, teaching his own style of “Abir-Qesheth Hebrew Warrior Arts” in Jerusalem and Tel Aviv, claiming it to be a tradition of his family dating to Israelite antiquity  preserved by an underground school of "Bani Abir" in Habban, Yemen, and styling himself Aluf Abir  "Grandmaster of Abir". Sofer perceives this style of martial arts training to be a continuation of the practices of the Jewish people prior to the Second Temple period.

The word  abir in Modern Hebrew means "knight". The style takes inspiration from the Hebrew alphabet, basing moves and stances on Hebrew letters.

See also
 Krav Maga, a 20th-century origin Israeli martial art conceived by Imi Sde-Or in the 1940s

References

External links
 Hebrew Warrior Arts official website 

1958 births
Living people
Israeli male karateka
Israeli hip hop musicians
Jamaican emigrants to Israel
Jamaican Jews
Israeli Jews
Jewish martial artists
Israeli rappers
Jamaican people of Israeli descent